Jacopo Silva (born 20 August 1991) is an Italian professional footballer who plays as a centre back for  club A.C. Renate.

Club career
Born in Piacenza, Silva spend six seasons on Piacenza Calcio and three for Pro Piacenza.

On 29 August 2019, he signed with Casertana.

On 9 October 2020, he joined Renate.

References

External links
 
 

1991 births
Living people
Sportspeople from Piacenza
Footballers from Emilia-Romagna
Italian footballers
Association football defenders
Serie C players
Serie D players
Piacenza Calcio 1919 players
A.S. Pro Piacenza 1919 players
Casertana F.C. players
A.C. Renate players